The Golden Globe Award for Best Actress in a Motion Picture – Drama is a Golden Globe Award that was first awarded by the Hollywood Foreign Press Association as a separate category in 1951. Previously, there was a single award for "Best Actress in a Motion Picture", but the splitting allowed for recognition of it and the Best Actress – Comedy or Musical.

The formal title has varied since its inception. In 2005, it was officially called "Best Performance by an Actress in a Motion Picture – Drama". As of 2013, the wording is "Best Actress in a Motion Picture – Drama".

Winners and nominees

1940s

1950s

1960s

1970s

1980s

1990s

2000s

2010s

2020s

Multiple nominees

14 nominations
 Meryl Streep

7 nominations
 Nicole Kidman

6 nominations
 Cate Blanchett
 Faye Dunaway
 Katharine Hepburn
 Geraldine Page

5 nominations
 Anne Bancroft
 Ingrid Bergman
 Jane Fonda
 Jodie Foster
 Glenda Jackson
 Jessica Lange
 Susan Sarandon
 Joanne Woodward

4 nominations
 Ellen Burstyn
 Jessica Chastain
 Judi Dench
 Sally Field
 Audrey Hepburn
 Diane Keaton
 Shirley MacLaine
 Michelle Pfeiffer
 Sissy Spacek
 Elizabeth Taylor
 Emma Thompson
 Liv Ullmann
 Kate Winslet

3 nominations
 Glenn Close
 Viola Davis
 Scarlett Johansson
 Helen Mirren
 Julianne Moore
 Vanessa Redgrave
 Gena Rowlands
 Jean Simmons
 Charlize Theron
 Sigourney Weaver
 Michelle Williams
 Debra Winger
 Natalie Wood

2 nominations
 Annette Bening
 Halle Berry
 Sandra Bullock
 Leslie Caron
 Julie Christie
 Jill Clayburgh
 Olivia Colman
 Bette Davis
 Olivia de Havilland
 Angelina Jolie
 Deborah Kerr
 Lady Gaga
 Anna Magnani
 Rooney Mara
 Marsha Mason
 Frances McDormand
 Melina Mercouri
 Sarah Miles
 Carey Mulligan
 Rosamund Pike
 Natalie Portman
 Lee Remick
 Saoirse Ronan
 Rosalind Russell
 Kristin Scott Thomas
 Simone Signoret
 Maggie Smith
 Sharon Stone
 Barbra Streisand
 Hilary Swank
 Tilda Swinton
 Uma Thurman
 Emily Watson
 Shelley Winters
 Jane Wyman

Multiple wins

3 wins
 Ingrid Bergman (2 consecutive)
 Cate Blanchett
 Jane Fonda (2 consecutive)
 Meryl Streep (2 consecutive)

2 wins
 Sally Field
 Jodie Foster
 Nicole Kidman
 Shirley MacLaine
 Geraldine Page (consecutive)
 Rosalind Russell (consecutive)
 Hilary Swank
 Joanne Woodward
 Jane Wyman

Firsts

 Anna Magnani received two nominations and won one award. She was the first non—English native speaker actress to win the prize and the first Italian woman. 

Anouk Aimée became the first actress to win for a foreign language/non-english language performance when she won in 1967.
Whoopi Goldberg became the first actress of African descent to win when she won in 1986.
Marlee Matlin became the first deaf actress to win when she won in 1987.

See also
 Academy Award for Best Actress
 Critics' Choice Movie Award for Best Actress
 Independent Spirit Award for Best Female Lead
 BAFTA Award for Best Actress in a Leading Role
 Golden Globe Award for Best Actress – Motion Picture Comedy or Musical
 Screen Actors Guild Award for Outstanding Performance by a Female Actor in a Leading Role

References

Actress Motion Picture Drama
 
Film awards for lead actress